The 9th Australian Academy of Cinema and Television Arts Awards (generally known as the AACTA Awards) is an award's ceremony to celebrate the best of Australian films and television of 2019. The main ceremony was held at The Star in Sydney and was televised on the Seven Network. First awards were presented on 4 December 2019.
The recipient of the Longford Lyell Award was actor and filmmaker Sam Neill.

Feature film

Television

Documentary

Short film

Additional awards

References

Further reading

AACTA Awards ceremonies
2019 in Australian cinema